Crematogaster atitlanica is a species of ant endemic to Guatemala.

References

atitlanica
Endemic fauna of Guatemala
Insects of Central America
Insects described in 1936
Taxa named by William Morton Wheeler
Taxonomy articles created by Polbot
Taxobox binomials not recognized by IUCN